Eleutherodactylus flavescens is a species of frog in the family Eleutherodactylidae endemic to the eastern Dominican Republic. Its natural habitats are mesic forest, and occasionally, mangroves. It is a very common frog in suitable habitat, but has declined in parts of its range. It is threatened by habitat loss caused by infrastructure development (including for tourism) and agricultural encroachment.

References

flavescens
Endemic fauna of the Dominican Republic
Amphibians of the Dominican Republic
Amphibians described in 1923
Taxonomy articles created by Polbot